Molly Kate Kestner (born November 29, 1995) is an American singer-songwriter most notable for her song "His Daughter", which went viral in 2014 in many countries. After the release of her debut self-released single, Kestner was signed to Atlantic Records and has released seven major label singles since joining their roster.

Early life
Kestner is one of seven siblings in her family.

Before the success of "His Daughter", Kestner performed covers and original material, and put them on YouTube for extended family members too far away from her and her family. In addition to singing and piano, Kestner is also an accomplished violinist. Kestner was a member of the 2012-2013 Minnesota Music Educators Association All-State Mixed Choir.

Success of "His Daughter"

"His Daughter" is a song written by Kestner that chronicles a woman that has an unplanned pregnancy.

Her video later brought the attention of Star Trek actor George Takei, who commented on his Facebook page "Has America found its young Adele? I'm nearly breathless from listening."  "His Daughter" also received attention from singer Jordin Sparks. Kestner's video later gained 2 million+ views after Takei and Sparks shared Kestner's video. Kestner later performed the song on Good Morning America.

Kestner later released a studio version of "His Daughter" on iTunes.

Discography

Singles
 "His Daughter" (2014)
 "Good Die Young" (2016)
 "Prom Queen" (2017)
 "It's You" (2017)
 "I Don't Know" (2017)
 "Compromise" (2017)
 "Footprints" (2017)
 "Not Over You" (2018)
 "On Again" (with Honors)(2018)
 "Prisoner" (2018)
 "My Way Up" (2019)
 "Get Up" (2021)
 "Troubles" (2021)
 "Bridges" (2021)
 "Better Than My Best" (2021)
 "Used to Be You" (2021)
 "Hiding in the Crowd" (2021)
 "Small Town Stars" (2022)
 "Hand That You Hold" (2022)
 "Blame It on the Weather" (2022)

Songwriting credits

Personal life
Kestner married singer-songwriter Brock Baker in 2016.

References

External links

 Official website
 Molly's Facebook
 Molly's Channel

Living people
1995 births
21st-century American singers
21st-century American violinists
American women singer-songwriters
American multi-instrumentalists
Atlantic Records artists
American YouTubers
Singer-songwriters from Minnesota
People from Austin, Minnesota
Viral videos
21st-century American pianists
American women pianists
21st-century American women singers